Veronika Halder (born 14 October 1980 in Hall in Tirol) is an Austrian luger who has competed since 2000. She won four medals at the FIL European Luge Championships with two silvers (Mixed team: 2008, 2010) and two bronzes (Women's singles: 2008, Mixed team: 2004).

Halder competed in two Winter Olympics, earning her best finish of fifth in the women's singles event at Turin in 2006. Her best finish at the FIL World Luge Championships was fifth in the women's singles event at Nagano in 2004.

References
 Austrian luge team profile of Hadler 
 FIL-Luge profile
 List of European luge champions

External links
 

1980 births
Living people
Austrian female lugers
Olympic lugers of Austria
People from Hall in Tirol
Lugers at the 2006 Winter Olympics
Lugers at the 2010 Winter Olympics
Sportspeople from Tyrol (state)
20th-century Austrian women
21st-century Austrian women